Chuk Yuen is a village in Sai Kung District, Hong Kong.

Administration
Chuk Yuen is a recognized village under the New Territories Small House Policy.

History
Chuk Yuen, together with Man Wo, of which it is considered to be an off-shoot, was part of the inter-village grouping, the Ho Chung Tung or Ho Chung Seven Villages, which had its centre in Ho Chung.

At the time of the 1911 census, the population of Chuk Yuen was 9. The number of males was 3.

References

External links
 Delineation of area of existing village Man Wo (Sai Kung) for election of resident representative (2019 to 2022) (includes Chuk Yuen)

Villages in Sai Kung District, Hong Kong